Everett High School is a secondary school located in Everett, Washington, United States, which educates grades 9 through 12. It was founded in 1880 as the first high school in the Everett School District. The incumbent Principal is Amanda M. Overly, who assumed office after former Principal Lance Balla transferred. The Deputy Principals are M. Ingraham, E. Jennings, & A. Vergara.

The school is listed on the National Register of Historic Places.

The school closed in Spring 2020 due to the COVID-19 pandemic. It has continued remote learning into the 2020-21 school year as per direction of the district superintendent. As of early November, Special Education students were ordered to begin re-attending school.

Athletics
Everett High School is part of District One of the Washington Interscholastic Activities Association (WIAA) as a member of the Wesco 3A conference. The school competes as the Seagulls, with its sports split between the conference's North and South divisions; the football team was formerly in the North division, but was moved to the South division when Wesco football realigned with the addition of the Ferndale Golden Eagles and the Squalicum Storm for the 2016 season.

Due to the construction of Everett High School occurring in the city's early years, it does not have on-site facilities for baseball and football; both teams practice and play home games south of the school at Everett Memorial Stadium as a result. The baseball team temporarily practiced on the football field at the stadium complex for the 2017 season and most of the 2018 season due to poor conditions at the baseball park (now known as Funko Field) caused by heavy rain along with simultaneous use by teams from both the school and Everett Community College. The baseball park had its natural grass surface replaced with artificial turf, with the Seagulls hosting their first game on the new surface on April 12, 2018.

The school has the claim of winning the unofficial national championship of high school football for the 1920 season. The football team, led by coach Enoch Bagshaw, achieved a perfect season that year; it was capped off on January 1, 1921, with a 16–7 defeat of East Technical High School from Cleveland, Ohio, at Athletic Field in Everett, now the site of Bagshaw Field at North Middle School. After the season, Bagshaw left to coach for the Washington Huskies football team, leading them to their first Rose Bowl appearance in 1923.

Notable alumni
 Stan Boreson, the "King of Scandinavian Humor"
 Chris Chandler, former NFL quarterback, guided the Atlanta Falcons to the Super Bowl
 Mike Champion (basketball), former NBA player 
 Chuck Close, artist
 Nancy Coleman, former actress
 Dennis Erickson, former NFL and college football head coach, last at Arizona State University
 Curt Farrier, former NFL defensive tackle
 Henry M. "Scoop" Jackson, U.S. Senator and presidential candidate
 Daniel J. Kremer, former Presiding Justice of the California Fourth District Court of Appeal, Division One
 Jim Lambright, former head football coach at the University of Washington
 Chuck Nelson, former NFL placekicker and broadcaster with the University of Washington
 Mike Price, head football coach at the University of Texas at El Paso, formerly at Washington State University
 Don Van Patten, member New Hampshire General Court
 Dick Ward, former MLB player (Chicago Cubs, St. Louis Cardinals)
 Don White, former MLB player (Philadelphia Athletics)
 Margaret Wiggum, aka Marge Simpson, real life mother of Matt Groening creator of Simpsons cartoon. Class of 1937.

Notes

References

External links
 Everett High School
 Everett Public Schools District website

Education in Everett, Washington
High schools in Snohomish County, Washington
School buildings on the National Register of Historic Places in Washington (state)
Public high schools in Washington (state)
National Register of Historic Places in Everett, Washington